Man Jeete Jag Jeet is a 1973 religious Punjabi film directed by B.S. Thapa, starring Sunil Dutt, Radha Saluja and Ranjeet in lead roles.

Music & Gurbani Shabad

There are a total of 11 songs in the movie songs were composed by S. Mohinder and Inderjit Hasanpuri penned the lyrics while many of the lyrical compositions are taken from the Gurbani (from the Sikh religious text, Guru Granth Sahib). Asha Bhosle, Suman Kalyanpur and Mohammad Rafi are the playback singers.

1. Ram Gaiyo Ravan Gaiyo-(Asha Bhosle)

2. Uda-Ada-Edi-Sassa-Haha Bolna Kade Naa Dolna-Suman Kalyanpur

3. Jis Ke Sar Upar Tu Swami-(Asha Bhosle)

4. Jagat Meh Jhoothi Dekhi Preet-[Mohalla-9] (Asha Bhosle)

5. Tu V Daku Te Mein V Daku-(Asha Bhosle)

6. Jadon-Jadon V Banere Bole Kaa-(Asha Bhosle)

7. Paapi Jiodeya Bol Satnam-(Asha Bhosle)

8. Jis Ke Sar Upar Tu Swami-(Shabad) Mohammad Rafi

9. Farida Kaale Mainde Kapre-(Mohammad Rafi)

10. Paapi Jiodeya Bol Satnam-(Asha Bhosle, Mohammad Rafi)

See also 
Nanak Nam Jahaz Hai

References

External links 

1973 films
Films set in Punjab, India
Punjabi-language Indian films
1970s Punjabi-language films
Films about Sikhism